Ishida Station may refer to:
 Ishida Station (Kyoto), a subway station on the Tōzai Line in Kyoto, Japan
 Ishida Station (Fukuoka), a railway station on the Hitahikosan Line in Kitakyūshū, Japan

See also
 Aikō-Ishida Station, a railway station in Kanagawa, on the Odakyū Odawara Line
 Dentetsu-Ishida Station, a railway station in Toyama, on the Toyama Chihō Railway Main Line